Bosnia and Herzegovina participated at the 2017 Summer Universiade, in Taipei, Taiwan with 3 competitors in 2 sports.

Competitors
The following table lists Bosnia and Herzegovina's delegation per sport and gender.

Athletics

Judo

References

Nations at the 2017 Summer Universiade